The siege of Mahdia was a seven month siege led by the Almohad Caliph Abd al-Mu’min against the Norman forces of King William I of Sicily.

The people of Ifriqiya sought help from Abd al-Mu’min against Norman occupation. Abd al-Mu’min led a large army into Tunisia and took Tripoli, Sfax and other cities from the Normans. Abd al-Mu’min besieged Mahdia for seven months, eventually the Almohad navy defeated the Normans and Abd al-Mu’min negotiated with them which resulted in the Normans surrendering Mahdia thus ending Norman rule in Africa. Abd al-Mu’min was successful in establishing his authority over Ifriqiya.

References

Mahdia
History of Mahdia
Military history of Tunisia
Mahdia